The Companion is a 2015 Cuban drama film directed by Pavel Giroud. It was selected as the Cuban entry for the Best Foreign Language Film at the 89th Academy Awards but it was not nominated.

Cast
 Camila Arteche as Lisandra
 Armando Miguel Gómez
 Broselianda Hernández as La Madre
 Yotuel Romero
 Jazz Vilá as Boris

Festivals & Awards 

 Cuba's Official Entry to the Academy Awards, Best Foreign Film, 2016.
 Cuba's Official Entry to the Goya Awards, Best Foreign Film, 2016.
 Busan International Film Festival, Official Selection World Cinema, 2015.
 Chicago International Film Festival, Official Selection World Cinema, 2015.
 Cinélatino: Recontres de Toulouse, Audience Award, 2016.
 Havana Film Festival New York, Best Screenplay 2016.
 Málaga International Film Festival, Audience Award, 2016.
 Miami International Film Festival, Audience Award, 2016.

See also
 List of submissions to the 89th Academy Awards for Best Foreign Language Film
 List of Cuban submissions for the Academy Award for Best Foreign Language Film

References

External links
 

2015 films
2015 drama films
Cuban drama films
2010s Spanish-language films